Margarete Cranmer (d. c. 1571) was the second wife of the reformation Archbishop of Canterbury, Thomas Cranmer. She was the niece of Katharina Preu, wife of Andreas Osiander, the principal reformer of Nuremberg and pastor of St. Lorenz, Nuremberg. Cranmer met her future husband during his six-month stay in Nuremberg in spring 1532 during his duties as an Ambassador of King Henry VIII to Emperor Charles V.

Life
Little is known about Cranmer's parents: "we know that Katharina Preu was the daughter of the brewer Heinrich Preu and Margarete his wife, née Hertzel, but we cannot be sure whether [Thomas] Cranmer’s wife was the daughter of a sister or brother of Katharina, so the younger Margaret’s maiden name remains uncertain". In July 1532, Osiander officiated at the wedding of his wife’s niece to Cranmer. In October 1532, Thomas Cranmer was recalled to London in order to succeed William Warham as Archbishop of Canterbury; he was consecrated on 30 March 1533.

Unlike Lutheran Nuremberg, England was Roman Catholic and therefore clerical celibacy was enforced. Sources differ as to whether Cranmer was able to live openly with her husband. Later recusant accounts suggest that Cranmer joined her husband clandestinely, having to hide in a ventilated chest during his travels through his province.. Others suggest that, until June 1539 and the prorogation of the Six Articles (1539) with its strict re-enforcement of clerical celibacy, Cranmer lived 'more or less openly as his wife until the reign of Queen Mary, except whilst the Act of the Six Articles was in force, when she retired with her children into Germany'.

The Cranmers' first child, Margaret, was born possibly in Germany as early as the 1532–33, and certainly before 1539. The couple's enforced eight-year separation ended with the accession of Edward VI in 1547 and Cranmer returned to England. By the 1550s, their son Thomas had been born and the Cranmers' marriage was widely acknowledged: the Zurich reformer John Stumphius informed Heinrich Bullinger that Thomas Cranmer had 'lately taken a wife'. Two months after the accession of Mary Tudor in 1553, Thomas Cranmer was charged with treason and sent first to the Tower and then to Oxford's Bocardo Prison. Cranmer most likely once more sought exile in her native Germany, though it is possible that she and her two children remained in hiding in England until her husband’s execution in March 1556.

After her husband's death, Cranmer married his friend and ally, Edward Whitchurch. Whitchurch had collaborated closely with Thomas Cranmer on the publication of the Great Bible in 1539. By the time of his marriage to Margarete Cranmer, he had been appointed ‘her Maiesties Printer for the Hebrew, Greke, & Latine tongs’. It was while she was married to Whitchurch that her daughter, Margaret, met and married the evangelical theologian, lawyer, author and translator Thomas Norton, who in 1561 lived with Edward Whitchurch and Margarete Cranmer. During his time in the Whitchurch household, Norton translated Calvin’s Institutes: ‘I performed my worke in the house of my sayd friende Edward VVhitchurch, a man well known of vpright hart and dealing, an auncient zelous Gospeller, as plaine and true a friend as euer I knew living, and as desirous to do any thinge to common good, specially by the advancement of true religion’. Edward Whitchurch died in late November 1561, making provision in his will, dated 25 November 1561, for his widow, his children Edward, Helen and Elizbathe, and his stepson Thomas Cranmer and stepdaughter Margaret Cranmer.

Though she was not without means, and derived regular income from her interest in Kirkstall Abbey, Yorkshire, a personal grant of land made to her first husband Thomas Cranmer under the terms of the dissolution of monastic houses and conveyed to her. Cranmer married for a third time in 1564.

Her marriage to Bartholomew Scott of Camberwell, friend of her son-in-law Thomas Norton and Justice of the Peace for Surrey, was not a happy one: 'Scott had won Margaret, it was alleged, by flattery and expressions of deepest sympathy, but after marriage he dissembled no more. The marriage was without love, comfort, or mutuality'. Cranmer fled to her estate in Kirkstall and separated from her husband. She most likely died in 1571. Following his death in 1600 she was memorialised by Scott on his epitaph in St Giles' Church, Camberwell as 'Margaret, ye wido of ye right reverend Prel. and Martyr Tho. Cranmer, Archbish. of Canterburie'. A  fire destroyed the church and the memorial, on 7 February 1841.

References

Year of birth missing
1571 deaths
Osiander family
People from Nuremberg
16th-century Protestants